This is a list of animated films produced in Albania during the 1980s.

Animated films
  (1980)
  (1980)
  (1980)
  (1980)
  (1980)
  (1980)
  (1981)
  (1981)
  (1981)
  (1981)
  (1981)
  (1981)
  (1981)
  (1981)
  (1981)
  (1981)
  (1982)
  (1982)
  (1982)
  (1982)
  (1982)
  (1982)
  (1982)
  (1982)
  (1983)
  (1983)
  (1983)
  (1983)
  (1983)
  (1983)
  (1983)
  (1983)
  (1983)
  (1983)
  (1983)
  (1983)
  (1983)
  (1983)
  (1983)
  (1983)
  (1984)
  (1984)
  (1984)
  (1984)
  (1984)
  (1984)
  (1984)
  (1984)
  (1984)
  (1984)
  (1984)
  (1985)
  (1985)
  (1985)
  (1985)
  (1985)
  (1985)
  (1985)
  (1985)
  (1985)
  (1985)
  (1985)
  (1986)
  (1986)
  (1986)
  (1986)
  (1986)
  (1986)
  (1986)
  (1986)
  (1986)
  (1986)
  (1986)
  (1986)
  (1986)
  (1987)
  (1987)
  (1987)
  (1987)
  (1987)
  (1987)
  (1987)
  (1987)
  (1987)
  (1988)
  (1988)
  (1988)
  (1988)
  (1988)
  (1988)
  (1988)
  (1988)
  (1988)
  (1988)
  (1988)
  (1988)
  (1988)
  (1988)
  (1988)
  (1989)
  (1989)
  (1989)
  (1989)
  (1989)
  (1989)
  (1989)
  (1989)
  (1989)
  (1989)
  (1989)

References

Lists of animated films
Lists of Albanian films